There are 622 kilometres of  railway in Burkina Faso, which run from Kaya to the border with Côte d'Ivoire and is part of the Abidjan-Ouagadougou railway. As of June 2014, 'Sitarail' operates a passenger train three times a week along the route from Ouagadougou to Abidjan. Journey time is 43 to 48 hours.

Burkina Faso is landlocked, but the railway to Abidjan provides rail access to a port. Links to railways in Ghana and the port of Takoradi have been repeatedly proposed.

Stations 
 

The following towns of Burkina Faso are served by the country's railways:
  -  - border
  Niangoloko
 Banfora
 Peni
 Bobo-Dioulasso
 Sala
 Koudougou
 Bingo
 Ouagadougou (national capital)
 Ziniaré (service suspended)
 Kaya terminus

Construction resuming 
 (for 3MTpa manganese - 2014)?
 Kaya (terminus)
 Dori (approx. 100 km of the extension from Kaya to Dori; visible on Google Earth dated 15/2/07)
 Markoye
 Tambao (manganese), near Niger/Mali borders

Proposed 
 ( gauge)
  Navrongo
  Bolgatanga
   Border (Ghana-Burkina Faso)
  Dakola
  Pô
  Bagré
  Ouagadougou - national capital - junction - break of gauge

See also 
  Railway stations in Burkina Faso
  Railway stations in Ghana

Proposed

2011 
On 31 November 2011, an agreement was signed to build a new international railway connecting Ivory Coast, Burkina Faso, Niger, and Benin. See AfricaRail.

2014 
Pan African Minerals to develop the Tambao manganese project at a cost of up to $1 billion. The manganese mine is in the north of Burkina Faso, near the border with Niger and Mali, containing perhaps 100 million tonnes of the metal (used in steel production). "The Tamboa project is an integrated project with a mining component and an infrastructure component, notably through the roads, railway and the port", said Romanian billionaire Frank Timis. "The project will happen in the next three years and will require investment of nearly $1 billion".

2018 
Ghana and Ivory Coast sign a deal to develop a through rail link.

Ghana and Burkina Faso sign deal for link Link

Maps 
 UN Map (no longer shows railway lines).
 UNHCR Map

Gallery

See also 
 Rail transport in Ghana; Ghana Railway Corporation
 Railway stations in Niger
 Railway stations in Ivory Coast
 Transport in Burkina Faso
 West Africa Regional Rail Integration

References

External links 

 
Burkina Faso